The Indira Marathon is a national annual full marathon held in Allahabad, India. It commemorates the birth anniversary of India's former prime minister, Indira Gandhi.  The race starts from Anand Bhawan, the ancestral home of the Nehru-Gandhi family.

References

Marathons in India
Allahabad culture
Recurring sporting events established in 1985
1985 establishments in Uttar Pradesh